Lapper is a surname. Notable people with the surname include:

Alison Lapper (born 1965), English artist
Mike Lapper (born 1970), American soccer player

See also
Lappe